Paul Iserman Elwood (born 1958) is an American composer, banjo player, inventor, and improvisor.

The music of Paul Elwood often incorporates his background as a folk musician and experimentalist on the five-string banjo with his voice as a composer who loves the processes and syntax of contemporary writing. A multimedia maestro, Elwood's multimedia performances draw from world travels, paranormal experiences and a healthy sense of humor.

Elwood has been the recipient of residencies at the American Academy in Rome as Southern Regional Visiting Composer, the Helene Wurlitzer Foundation of New Mexico, MacDowell Colony, Djerassi Artists Residence Program, Ucross Foundation, Camargo Foundation (France), Fundación Valparaíso (Spain), and the Harwood Museum of Art in Taos.

In 2000 he was awarded the Sigma Alpha Iota Philanthropies Inter-American Music Award for Vigils for solo piano and was featured as a composer and performer in Moscow, Mexico City, Marseille, Wollongong, Edinburgh, Darmstadt, and across the United States.

As a composer his music has been performed by the symphonies of North Carolina, Charleston, South Carolina, and Wichita, and by the Callithumpian Consort of the New England Conservatory, Zeitgeist, pianist Stephen Drury, Tambuco (the Mexican Percussion Quartet), and pipa players Min Xiaofen and Gao Hong, among others.

As a performer he won the Kansas State Banjo Championship, worked with guitarist Eugene Chadbourne, cellist Hank Roberts, French saxophonist Raphael Imbert, Andrew Bishop's Hank Williams Project, Electric Cowboy Cacophony, and bluegrass legend John Hartford, performed live on MTV Europe, and played percussion in a number of orchestras. Elwood's teachers include J.C. Combs, percussion, and composers Donald Erb, David Felder, Walter Mays, Arthur S. Wolff, and Charles Wuorinen.

He is a Fellow of the American Academy in Rome and of the Camargo Foundation, Cassis, France. In 2000 Elwood won the Sigma Alpha-Iota Inter-American Music Awards, a 2007 commissioning grant from the Jerome Foundation to compose for Zeitgeist, and a 2010 CAP grant of the American Music Center to present his music in Bulgaria.

Recent recordings are on Innova Recordings as composer/banjoist with percussionist Famoudou Don Moye of the Art Ensemble of Chicago (titled Nice Folks, January 2015), Misfit Toys (2013, featuring drummer Matt Wilson, percussionist Dan Moore, and reed player Robert Paredes) and his own chamber and folk music, Stanley Kubrick's Mountain Home (2011) featuring bluegrass legend John Hartford and Wichita native Matt Combs, with bassist Bertram Turetzky (2008), and Electric Cowboy Cacophony (Edinburgh, 2008). Recent projects took him to London to record with percussionist Eddie Prévost of the legendary AMM improvisational ensemble, Edinburgh to play with saxophonist Sue McKenzie, and in his own backyard to record bluegrass versions of Bee Gees songs with Spencer Gibb, son of Bee Gee Robin Gibb.

He received his B.M.E. at Wichita State University, his M.M. in composition from Southern Methodist University, and his Ph.D. in composition from the State University of New York at Buffalo. Previously he served on the faculty at Brevard College in North Carolina, where he taught composition, music theory and sight singing. In the fall of 1998, he was the Southern Regional Visiting Composer at the American Academy in Rome. He is currently a professor at the University of Northern Colorado, Greeley, Colorado.

List of works 
 "Let's Go Pet The Lion: an example of minor 6ths"
 Over Looking Glass Falls (2006), orchestra, premiered February 2007 by the North Carolina Symphony. The concert was broadcast by WCPE-FM on July 2, 2007.
 Psalm Eight (2005), mixed chorus (SATB), King James text. 
 Winter Fires (2005), women's chorus (SAA), Text by David St. John.
 Hymn (2005), women's chorus (SAA), Text by Jack Kerouac.
 In the Middle (2005), mixed chorus (SATB), Text by Paul Elwood.
 Capricious Apparitions for 2 violas and bowed banjo (2009)

External links
 

20th-century classical composers
21st-century classical composers
1958 births
American male classical composers
American classical composers
American banjoists
Living people
Place of birth missing (living people)
21st-century American composers
20th-century American composers
20th-century American male musicians
21st-century American male musicians